Santa Fe National Cemetery is a United States National Cemetery in the city of Santa Fe, in Santa Fe County, New Mexico. It encompasses , and as of 2021, had 68,000 interments. Administered by the United States Department of Veterans Affairs, it is one of two national cemeteries in New Mexico (the other being Fort Bayard).  It was listed on the National Register of Historic Places in 2016.

History 
The first known burial in the cemetery occurred in 1868 prior to the formal establishment of the land as a national cemetery. Though New Mexico only played a small part in the American Civil War, the cemetery was created after the war to inter the Union soldiers who died fighting there, primarily at the Battle of Glorieta Pass. The Roman Catholic Archdiocese of Santa Fe donated the land to the federal government in 1870. In 1876 its status was changed to a post cemetery, but in 1885 it became a national cemetery once again. The remains of Governor Charles Bent, the first American governor of the Territory of New Mexico, were among 47 bodies removed in 1895 from the old Masonic Cemetery in Santa Fe to the national cemetery. Between 1896 and 
1912, the government moved remains here from several abandoned forts which had small post cemeteries including Apache and Grant in Arizona, Hatch and Wingate in New Mexico, and Duchesne in Utah among many other smaller posts. In 1953, the government acquired an additional 25 acres, bringing the cemetery to 34 acres. On 
June 23, 1987, the remains of 31 Confederate soldiers of the Texas Mounted Volunteers who were killed or died as a result of wounds during the Battle of Glorieta Pass were discovered in a mass grave on the battlefield. Three were identified and 28 who could not be identified were reburied in Section K together. In 2007 the remains of sixty-four federal soldiers and civilians discovered by the U.S. Bureau of Reclamation at the site of Fort Craig were relocated to here. In 2017 the Veterans Administration was unsuccessful in purchasing six acres of land adjacent to the cemetery and current estimates are that the site will be at capacity before 2030.

Notable monuments 
 Memorial made of granite and bronze dedicated to World War II Glider Pilots, erected in 1994.
 Memorial to "Women Who Served in the Navy" erected in 1995.
 The China-Burma-India Veterans Memorial, dedicated to World War II veterans, erected in 2002.
 The Navajo Code Talkers Memorial, erected in 2013.

Notable interments 

 Medal of Honor recipients
 First Lieutenant Alexander Bonnyman Jr., for action at the Battle of Tarawa during World War II
 Watertender Edward A. Clary, for peace time service on board USS Hopkins
 Private Edwin L. Elwood, for action in Arizona Territory during the Indian Wars
 Specialist Four Daniel D. Fernandez, for action during the Vietnam War
 Corporal Jacob Guenther, for action in Arizona Territory during the Indian Wars
 Second Lieutenant Raymond G. Murphy USMC, for action in Korea on February 3, 1953
 Corporal Thomas Murphy, US Army, for action in the Indian Wars
 Yuma Indian and Army Scout Sergeant Y. B. Rowdy, for action in Arizona Territory during the Indian Wars
 Captain Robert S. Scott, for action in World War II
 Private First Class Jose F. Valdez, for action during World War II
 Others
 Captain George Nicholas Bascom, Union officer killed in the Battle of Val Verde in 1862
 Governor Charles Bent, first American governor of New Mexico Territory
 Lieutenant Colonel José Francisco Chaves, Union Army officer during the American Civil War, U.S. Representative from the New Mexico Territory
 John O. Crosby, musician, conductor and arts administrator, U.S. Army Veteran
 Tony Hillerman, novelist and journalist
 Van Dorn Hooker, University architect for the University of New Mexico
 Patrick J. Hurley,  Major General, World War I and World War II, U.S. Ambassador to China from (1944–45), and  Secretary of War for President Herbert Hoover
 James B. Jones, lieutenant governor of New Mexico
 Jack P. Juhan, Marine Corps Major General
 Oliver La Farge, 1930 Pulitzer Prize winning author of the novel Laughing Boy, Army Major during World War II
 Francis W. Nye, Air Force Major General during World War II and Korean War
 James P. Riseley, Marine Corps Lieutenant General
 William G. Ritch, acting Governor of the New Mexico Territory, member of the Wisconsin State Senate
 John Bristol Speer, attorney, judge, politician, and writer
 Roy Tackett, Marine Corps Master Sergeant credited with the introduction of Sci-Fi to Japan and co-founder of Bubonicon
 Valentin de Vargas, actor, U.S. Army veteran.
 Frank Chee Willeto, Navajo code talker, Congressional Silver Medal recipient and Vice President of the Navajo Nation (1998–1999)

See also

 National Register of Historic Places listings in Santa Fe County, New Mexico

References

External links 

 National Cemetery Administration
 Santa Fe National Cemetery
 
 
 

Cemeteries in New Mexico
United States national cemeteries
Protected areas of Santa Fe County, New Mexico
Historic American Landscapes Survey in New Mexico
Tourist attractions in Santa Fe, New Mexico
1870 establishments in New Mexico Territory
Cemeteries on the National Register of Historic Places in New Mexico
National Register of Historic Places in Santa Fe, New Mexico
Pueblo Revival architecture in Santa Fe, New Mexico